ProgPower USA is a progressive and power metal festival held annually in the United States since 2001. Its upcoming edition, ProgPower USA XXI is scheduled to take place on June 1–4, 2022. The festival's band selection process focuses on quality over quantity.  In addition to the emphasis on the power and progressive metal genres, the festival has branched out into other genres with the inclusion of the "oddball" slot that does not fit the normal motif.  ProgPower USA gives bands that have never performed in the States a chance to perform in the country.  The festival has been described as a cultural experience for fans with autograph signing sessions, guest appearances, reunions, and meet-and-greets.  The festival has hosted over 70 bands' USA debuts including Blind Guardian, Gamma Ray, Nightwish, and Stratovarius.

History 
ProgPower USA began in 2001. The very first festival was February 23–24, 2001, in Lansing, Illinois, just outside Chicago, at J.J. Kelley's. The subsequent events have been held in Atlanta, Georgia, at Center Stage Atlanta (formerly Earthlink Live).

Festival founder and promoter, Glenn Harveston's notion of ProgPower USA began over dinner among friends after attending the Powermad festival in Baltimore, Maryland.  As the festival progressed, the roster scope diversified with the intent of reaching a larger fan base.  The brand's international success is based upon an unofficial partnership with ProgPower Europe.  The festival overcame early hardship from an attendance perspective due to the tragic events of September 11 at ProgPower II and flourished with multiple sell-outs over the next 13 years.

In the program for ProgPower XIX (as well as repeated posts on social media), Glenn announced ProgPower XXV (in 2025) will be his final year of the festival.

ProgPower XXI is notorious for being delayed twice by the COVID-19 pandemic and being the first edition to be held in June.

Lineups

February 2001 
ProgPower USA I was held at J.J. Kelley's in Lansing, Illinois, on February 23–24, 2001.

November 2001 
ProgPower USA II was held at Center Stage (then called Earthlink Live) in Atlanta, Georgia on November 9 & 10, 2001.

2002 
ProgPower USA III was held at Center Stage (then called Earthlink Live) in Atlanta, Georgia, on November 15–16, 2002

Pre-Show Party
The ProgPower USA III Pre-Show Party was held Thursday November 14, 2002, at The Riviera Club in Atlanta, Georgia.

2003 
ProgPower USA IV was held on September 5–6, 2003, at Center Stage (then called Earthlink Live) in Atlanta, Georgia.

Pre-Show Party
The ProgPower USA IV Pre-Show Party was held September 4, 2003, at The Riviera Club in Atlanta, Georgia.

2004 
ProgPower USA V took place on September 17–18, 2004, at Center Stage Atlanta (then called Earthlink Live) in Atlanta, Georgia.

Showcase
The Showcase took place on Thursday September 16, 2004, at The Eleven50 Club.

2005 
ProgPower USA VI took place on September 16–17, 2005 at Center Stage Atlanta (then called Earthlink Live) in Atlanta, Georgia.

Showcase
The Showcase took place on Thursday September 15, 2005, at The Loft (above Center Stage) in Atlanta, Georgia.

2006 
ProgPower USA VII took place on September 15–16, 2006 at Center Stage in Atlanta, Georgia.

Showcase
The Showcase took place on Thursday September 14, 2006, at The Loft (above Center Stage) in Atlanta, Georgia.

2007 
ProgPower USA VIII took place on October 5–6, 2007 at Center Stage Atlanta in Atlanta, Georgia.

The All Star Jam was a collaboration of members of various bands who performed throughout the weekend playing familiar classic metal songs.

Showcase
The Showcase took place on Thursday October 4, 2007, at Center Stage in Atlanta, Georgia.
From 2007 forward all Showcases (now called the Kick-Off) take place at the main Center Stage theater.

2008 
ProgPower USA IX took place on September 26–27, 2008 at Center Stage Atlanta in Atlanta, Georgia.

Kick-Off
This Kick-Off for this year was billed as the Hellish Rock World Tour as Manticora, Gamma Ray and Helloween were on tour at the time and used the Showcase date as a regular tour stop. This event took place in the main Center Stage theater on Thursday September 25, 2008.

Mid-Week Mayhem
The first Mid-Week Mayhem at ProgPower USA was held at The Loft (above Center Stage on Wednesday September 24, 2008, in Atlanta, Georgia.

2009 
ProgPower USA X took place on September 11–12, 2009 at Center Stage Atlanta in Atlanta, Georgia.

Kick-Off
The Kick-Off took place on Thursday September 10, 2009, at Center Stage in Atlanta, Georgia.

2010 
ProgPower USA XI took place on September 10–11, 2010 at Center Stage Atlanta in Atlanta, Georgia.

Kick-Off
The Kick-Off took place on Thursday September 9, 2010, at Center Stage in Atlanta, Georgia.

Mid-Week Mayhem
The Mid-Week Mayhem took place on Wednesday September 8, 2010, at The Loft at Center Stage in Atlanta, Georgia.

2011 
ProgPower USA XII took place on September 16–17, 2011 at Center Stage Atlanta in Atlanta, Georgia.

Kick-Off
The Kick-Off took place on Thursday September 15, 2011, at Center Stage in Atlanta, Georgia.

Mid-Week mayhem
The Mid-Week Mayhem took place on Wednesday September 14, 2010, at The Loft at Center Stage in Atlanta, Georgia.

Evergrey (Acoustic) followed by metal karaoke.

2012 
ProgPower USA XIII took place on September 14–15, 2012, at Center Stage Atlanta in Atlanta, Georgia.

Instead of a Kick-Off and Mid-Week Mayhem, Nightwish and Kamelot performed Wednesday and Thursday night before the festival, September 12–13, 2012.

2013 
ProgPower USA XIV took place on September 6–7, 2013, at Center Stage Atlanta in Atlanta, Georgia.

Kick-Off
The Kick-Off took place on Thursday September 5, 2013, at Center Stage) in Atlanta, Georgia.

Mid-week Mayhem
The Mid-Week Mayhem took place on Wednesday September 4, 2013, at The Loft at Center Stage) in Atlanta, Georgia.

2014 
ProgPower USA XV took place on September 12–13, 2014, at Center Stage Atlanta in Atlanta, Georgia.

Kick-Off
The Kick-Off took place on Thursday September 11, 2014, at Center Stage) in Atlanta, Georgia.

Mid-Week Mayhem
The Mid-Week Mayhem took place on Wednesday September 10, 2014.

2015 
ProgPower USA XVI took place on September 11–12, 2015, at Center Stage Atlanta in Atlanta, Georgia.

Kick-Off
The Kick-Off took place on Thursday September 10, 2015, at Center Stage in Atlanta, Georgia.

Mid-Week Mayhem
The Mid-Week Mayhem took place on Wednesday September 9, 2015, at The Loft at Center Stage in Atlanta, Georgia.

2016 
ProgPower USA XVII took place on September 7–10, 2016, at Center Stage Atlanta in Atlanta, Georgia. Starting in 2016, ProgPower USA became a full four-day event. The Mid-Week Mayhem (Wednesday) and Kick-Off (Thursday) shows are now known as Days 1 and 2 respectively of the new format, while the traditional ProgPower USA Friday and Saturday shows are now Days 3 and 4 respectively.

Days 1 & 2
Days 1 and 2 (September 7–8, 2016) took place at Center Stage in Atlanta, Georgia. Day 2 (Thursday show) was called the Promoter's Pick night. There were four bands per day.

Days 3 & 4
Days 3 and 4 (September 9–10, 2016) took place at Center Stage in Atlanta, Georgia. These days are considered to be main event with six bands per day.

2017 
ProgPower USA XVIII took place on September 6–9, 2017 at Center Stage Atlanta in Atlanta, Georgia.

Days 1 & 2
Days 1 and 2 took place on September 6–7, 2017, at Center Stage in Atlanta, Georgia, with four bands on Wednesday and five bands on Thursday.

Days 3 & 4
Days 3 and 4 took place on September 8–9, 2017, at Center Stage in Atlanta, Georgia, with six bands per day.

2018 
ProgPower USA XIX took place on September 5–8, 2018 at Center Stage Atlanta in Atlanta, Georgia.

Days 1 & 2
Days 1 and 2 took place on September 5–6, 2018 at Center Stage in Atlanta, Georgia, with four bands per day.

Days 3 & 4
Days 3 and 4 took place on September 7–8, 2018 at Center Stage in Atlanta, Georgia, with six bands per day.

2019 
ProgPower USA XX took place on September 4–7, 2019 at Center Stage Atlanta in Atlanta, Georgia.

Days 1 & 2
Days 1 and 2 took place on September 4–5, 2019 at Center Stage in Atlanta, Georgia, with four bands per day.

Days 3 & 4
Days 3 and 4 took place on September 6–7, 2019 at Center Stage in Atlanta, Georgia, with six bands per day.

2022 
ProgPower USA XXI is now scheduled to take place on June 1–4, 2022, at Center Stage Atlanta in Atlanta, Georgia.

Days 1 & 2
Days 1 and 2 are scheduled to take place on June 1–2, 2022, at Center Stage in Atlanta, Georgia.

Days 3 & 4
Days 3 and 4 are scheduled to take place on June 3–4, 2022 at Center Stage in Atlanta, Georgia.

2023 
ProgPower USA XXII is scheduled to take place on September 6-9, 2023 at Center Stage Atlanta in Atlanta, Georgia.

Days 1 & 2
Days 1 and 2 are scheduled to take place on September 6-7, 2023 at Center Stage in Atlanta, Georgia.

Days 3 & 4
Days 3 and 4 are scheduled to take place on September 8-9, 2023 at Center Stage in Atlanta, Georgia.

Postponed and cancelled lineups

2020–2021 
ProgPower USA XXI was originally scheduled to take place on September 9–12, 2020 at Center Stage Atlanta in Atlanta, Georgia. However, due to the COVID-19 pandemic it was postponed. This was announced on May 22, 2020.

The rescheduled dates for ProgPower USA XXI were to take place on September 8–11, 2021 at Center Stage Atlanta in Atlanta, Georgia. Due to the COVID-19 pandemic, it was postponed again.

References 

1. EvilG. "Heart of Steel: Interviews Glenn Harveston Organizer of ProgPower USA." Metal-Rules. March 2003. Web. November 28, 2013.

2. http://vimeo.com/75257334

3. Gromen, Mark. "Onstage ProgPower VII." Metal Maniacs. February 2007: 108–109. Print.

4. Wagner, Jeff; Wilson, Steven (2010). Mean Deviation: Four Decades of Progressive Heavy Metal. Bazillion Points Books. p. 331. .

5. Devani, Sarjoo. "ProgPower USA VII." Explicitly Intense. 2006: 46–47. Print.

6. Hicks, Taylor. "ProgPower USA." Rock N Roll. December 2012: 50–51. Print.

7. Popke, Michael. "A Progressively Metallic Power Play: ProgPower USA V Unfolds with Plenty of Surprises and Establishes itself as one of the World's Elite Music Festivals." Progression Magazine. Spring 2005: 71–74. Print.

8. Ollila, Mape (2007). Once Upon a Nightwish: The Official Biography 1996–2006. Deggael Communications. p. 191. .

9. Murphy, Bill. "Glenn Harveston: "I Think I Have Reached An Elite Level With This Festival". Dark Rhapsody. December 2007. Web. November 28, 2013.

10. Mendonca, Milton. "Audio Interview with ProgPower USA Promoter, Glenn Harveston PART 1." YouTube. November 12, 2012. November 28, 2013.

11. Reesman, Bryan. "A Ride with Dream Theater's John Petrucci." Grammy.com. September 2013. Web. November 28, 2013.

12. De Campos, Vanessa. "ProgPower USA IX Atlanta, 26th September 2008." Fireworks. March/April 2009: 77–78. Print. Issue 35

13. Johnsen, Matt. "ProgPower 2.0." Metal Maniacs. August 2002: 96–98. Print.

Further reading 

 Johnsen, Matt. "ProgPower Fest IV." Metal Maniacs. March 2004: 85–88. Print.
 Frederick, Carl. "Experience ProgPower USA from the Eyes of a First-time Attendee." Metalunderground.com. September 19, 2012. Web. November 28, 2013.
 Serafine, Frank. "ProgPower USA XIV: At a Glance- Newcomers and What to Watch For." Metalunderground.com. August 21, 2013. Web. November 28, 2013.
 War, Erika. "ProgPower XIV – A Quick Review." Rocknotes Webzine. September 2013. Web. November 28, 2013.
 Gromen, Mark. "ProgPower USA 2013 – Good-Natured Family Feud." Bravewords.com. September 11, 2013. Web. November 28, 2013.
 Richardson, Justin. "ProgPower USA 2012 Recap Day 1." Hellbound.ca. February 22, 2013. Web. November 28, 2013.
Nov 28, 2013.
 Griffy, Chris. "ProgPower USA 2014 Sells Out on Strength of Exclusives." Examiner.com. November 4, 2013. January 4, 2014.
 Gromen, Mark. "JON OLIVA'S PAIN Introduce New Guitarist; ProgPower USA To Be Only Show For 2014." Bravewords.com. April 24, 2014. Web. April 24, 2014.
 Frederick, Carl. "ProgPower USA Names Need As Replacement Act As Thought Chamber Drops Off Roster." Metalunderground.com. April 23, 2014. Web. April 24, 2014.
 "Prog, Power & The Glory" Metal Maniac Heavy Metal Magazine, in Italian
November 2014, pages 48–50, ISSN 1825-7992

Photo galleries 
 Ahola, Esa. ProgPower USA. Web. November 28, 2013.
 Thomas, Allen Ross. ProgPower USA. Web. November 28, 2013.
 Schmidt, Stephen. ProgPower USA. Web. November 28, 2013.

External links 
 (Archived version)
ProgPower USA on YouTube

Heavy metal festivals in the United States
Music festivals established in 2001